State Security Cabinet (SSC) (HaKabinet HaMedini-Bithoni) or Ministerial Committee on National Security Affairs (NSAC- National Security Affairs Committee) (Va'adat HaSarim Le'Inyanei Bitahon leomi) is a narrow forum of "Inner Cabinet" within the Israeli Cabinet, headed by the Prime Minister of Israel, with the purpose of outlining a foreign and defense policy and implementing it. This smaller forum of the cabinet members, is designated to coordinate the diplomatic negotiations, and in times of crisis, especially war, it is designed to make quick and effective decisions.

History
The idea of establishing a Security Cabinet was initially part of the Centre Party's platform of 1999 election, chaired by Yitzhak Mordechai. The party offered a new security plan, in which a Security Cabinet will be established for the purpose of implementing an effective peace and security plan. According to their platform, a new council for diplomatic planning and advising will be established, that will be headed by a person appointed by the Prime Minister, who will preside over small professional teams in the relevant fields. Furthermore, they suggested that the Prime Minister, Acting Prime Minister, Vice Prime Minister, the Director-Generals of the Defense, Foreign, and Treasury ministries, as well as the Chief of General Staff, chief of Shin Bet, and the Military Secretary to Prime Minister, will take part in the Security Cabinet meetings on regular basis, and that others presiding over the diplomatic negotiations or any other relevant officials will participate accordingly. The idea behind the Security Cabinet was to create a professional objective advising body to the Cabinet. The members would evaluate different situations, offer alternatives and oversight, and determine positions on the Cabinet and the army.

In practice, the forming of this body was based on section 6 of the "Government Law" of 2001 that stipulated the following:

"The Government shall have a ministers committee composed of: The Prime Minister—chairman, Acting Prime Minister, if such was appointed, Defence Minister, Interior Minister, Internal Security Minister and the Treasury Minister. 

The Government may, upon the proposal of the Prime Minister, coopt an additional members to the committee, provided that the number of its members not aggregate exceeding half of the Cabinet Members." 

Concerning the issues to be addressed, the law stipulated that:

(A) The diplomatic-security and settling issues shall be debated within the committee.

(B) The  daily agenda of the committee, and the officials to be invited to participate in its meetings shall be determined by the Prime Minister, after consulting with the minister in charge.

(C) The Minister in charge, prior to any decision making, may demand on any matter debated within the committee to be moved to a full Cabinet meeting to be debated and resolved. The aforementioned shall not apply, should the Prime Minister be ascertain, after consulting with the minister in charge, that the circumstances concerning the matter requires an immediate decision or that there are other circumstances that justifies the committee's decision.

The "War Cabinet"

During Yom Kippur War, a group of ministers was formed arbitrarily, and had assumed responsibility for taking fundamental decisions during that war. This group became known as "The War Cabinet", and later was also nicknamed "Golda's kitchen". The "War Cabinet" had made independent decisions during those emergency times, and the Government had approved those decisions only in retrospect. Against that background, already during those times, the question of the necessity and role of such a cabinet arose. On the other hand, some suggested that the Cabinet members should run the war as they see fit—without the need of getting anybody's approval.

Structure

Cabinet members
 Permanent members:

Appointment by law:

 Prime Minister: Benjamin Netanyahu, Chairman
 Foreign Minister: Eli Cohen
Alternate Prime Minister of Israel: Vacant
 Defense Minister: Yoav Galant
 Justice Minister: Yariv Levin
 Strategic Affairs Minister: Ron Dermer
 Transportation Minister: Miri Regev
 Energy Minister: Yisrael Katz

Additional members:
 Minister of Health and Minister of Interior: Aryeh Deri
 Minister of Finance: Bezalel Smotrich
 Minister of National Security: Itamar Ben-Gvir

Permanent invitees:      
 Attorney General of Israel: Gali Baharav-Miara
 NSC Chief: Eyal Hulata
 Military Secretary to the Prime Minister: Maj. General Avi Gil

References

Executive branch of the government of Israel
Law of Israel
Politics of Israel